Sumter is an unincorporated community in Sumter Township, McLeod County, Minnesota, United States.  The community is located along Highway 212 at Leaf Avenue near Brownton and Glencoe.

References

Unincorporated communities in McLeod County, Minnesota
Unincorporated communities in Minnesota